Granados is the municipal seat of Granados Municipality in the northeast of the Mexican state of Sonora. The municipal area is 361.27 km2, and the population was 1,228 according to the 2000 census. By 2005 the population had decreased to 938 due to emigration due to insufficient educational infrastructure and the lack of job opportunities.

The terrain is mountainous and the average annual temperature is 19 °C. The rainy season is from July to September and the average annual rainfall is 485.9 mm.

Subsistence agriculture and cattle raising are the main economic activities. The main crops are corn and beans and grasses for fodder. Calves are exported to the United States of America.

The town was named after Don José Joaquín Granados y Gálvez, second bishop of Sonora from 1788 to 1794.

References

External links
 Photo of Granados

Populated places in Sonora
Populated places established in 1823
1823 establishments in Mexico